Gopal Singh Khalsa OBE (born 1903, date of death unknown) was an Indian independence activist and politician.

Life
Khalsa, was born in 1903 into Ramdasia Sikh Chamar  family at a village around Sidhwan Bet area.

He did his schooling from Malwa Khalsa High School (Ludhiana) and B.A from Panjab University. Khalsa went to the United States in 1923 and spent three years there and did LLB from the San Joaquin Delta College, Stockton (California).

He also received Order of the British Empire.

Political career

Before Independence
Later, joined the Hindustan National Party and finally returned to India in 1931. After his return, he took keen interest in the welfare of the Dalits and joined the All India Scheduled Castes Federation of B. R. Ambedkar.

He was a member of the S. C. F. Working Committee and a close associate of Dr Ambedkar from 1937 to 1946. In 1937, he was elected as an independent candidate for the Punjab Provincial Assembly. He was then appointed Parliamentary Secretary to the Punjab Premier, Sikandar Hayat Khan.

From 1937 to 1946 he was also a nominated member of the District Board of Ludhiana, After the second world war in 1946, he was appointed as an officer in the Labour Department of the Government of India.

After Independence
In 1952 he joined the Akali Dal, ran on its ticket for the 1952, and became the Leader of the Opposition in the Punjab Legislative Assembly.

He had during his political career edited a couple of magazines and papers, and from 1952 to 1954 was Chief Editor of the Daily Prabhat, the Urdu spokesman of the Akali Dal.

In 1956 as a result of the merger of the Akali Dal with the Indian National Congress, he joined the latter organization. He played a prominent role in the organization of the Malwa Akali Dal to oppose Master Tara Singh and his Akali Dal in the 1959 elections to the Shiromani Gurdwara Parbandhak Committee.

References

1903 births
Year of death missing
Leaders of the Opposition in Punjab, India
Shiromani Akali Dal politicians
Indian National Congress politicians from Punjab, India